"Nuestro juramento" (English: "Our oath") is a bolero by Puerto Rican songwriter Benito de Jesús and popularized throughout Latin America by Ecuadorian singer Julio Jaramillo. Jaramillo's original recording of the song was made in 1956, featuring Rosalino Quintero on requinto guitar, and released in 1957 by Ónix. The lyrics of the song talk about two lovers who have made an oath to love each other until death and beyond; if the man dies first, the woman promises to spill all her tears over his corpse and to make everyone know about her love, and if she dies first, the man promises to write the story of their love with blood from his heart.

Nuestro juramento is the most popular song in the history of Ecuador, especially in Guayaquil, where Julio Jaramillo was from. However, most Ecuadorians are unaware that it was written by someone outside their country.

Benito de Jesús said to be living off the royalties of "Nuestro juramento". Every 6 months he received royalties from different countries.

Other versions
Many singers have sung versions of "Nuestro juramento", including Ecuadorian singer Olimpo Cárdenas, Colombian singers Charlie Zaá and Alci Acosta, Peruvian singer Tania Libertad, Puerto Rican singer Daniel Santos, Puerto Rican singer José Feliciano, and the Mexican groups Los Baby's and Café Tacvba. The latter was in the soundtrack of the movie Crónicas, directed by Sebastián Cordero.

References

External links
 Julio Jaramillo – Nuestro Juramento on YouTube

Ecuadorian songs
Boleros
Spanish-language songs